The 2018–19 film awards season began in November 2018 with the Gotham Independent Film Awards 2018 and ended in February 2019 with the 91st Academy Awards. Major winners for the year included Roma, Green Book, Bohemian Rhapsody, and The Favourite, among others.

Award ceremonies

References

American film awards